NTT Facilities Inc. (株式会社エヌ・ティ・ティ・ファシリティーズ in Japanese) is an  architecture firm headquartered in Minato, Tokyo. It started as the old NTT's Architecture and Engineering department and was incorporated as a wholly owned subsidiary of NTT in 1992.

Subsidiaries
Japan
 NTT Facilities Research Institute (100%)
 NTT Facilities FM Assist (100%)
 NTT Intelligent Planning and Development Corporation (100%)
 NTT GP-ECOcommunication, Inc. (75%)
 Ennet (40%)
USA
 NTT Facilities USA (100%)
 Electronic Environments Corporation (60%)
China
 NTT設施工程設計（北京） (100%)
Singapore
 Pro-Matrix (51%)
Thai
 Unitrio Technology (49%)

Sponsorship 
 Omiya Ardija (Japanese football clubs formerly affiliated with NTT)
 NHK Symphony Orchestra

See also
NTT and its Group companies:
 NTT Communications (NTT Europe, etc.)
 NTT Docomo
 NTT Data
 NTT Comware

References
 NTT FACILITIES Company Profile

External links
 NTT FACILITIES

Architecture firms of Japan
Nippon Telegraph and Telephone
Japanese companies established in 1992